Virata is a king in the Hindu epic Mahabharata

Virata may also refer to:

Virata Kingdom, ancient Indian kingdom
Virata Parva, book of the Mahabharata
Virata Corporation, British engineering company
Cesar Virata (born 1930), Filipino politician and Prime Minister of the Philippines
Leonides S. Virata Memorial School, Catholic private school in the Philippines

See also
 INS Viraat, Indian aircraft carrier
 Viraat, 2013 film